Oh Kyu Won (December 29, 1941 – February 2, 2007) was a South Korean writer.

Life
Oh Kyu Won's original name was Oh Gyuok. Born on December 29, 1941 in Miryang, Gyeongsangnam-do, he attended Busan Teachers' School before graduating from the Law Department of Dong-a University. He was the president of the Munjangsa publishing company, and is presently a professor in the Department of Creative Writing at the Seoul Institute of the Arts.

Work

Oh Kyu Won's early poems use witty, sparkling, and ironic language in an effort to destroy established forms and provide a critique of the baseness and emptiness of capitalist consumer culture. Through the process of the endless deconstruction and regeneration of his poetic material, he refashioned everyday words and recognizable images in order to produce the “unconsciousness of modernity,” and in doing so capture certain realities of everyday life particular features of our mental landscape that are generally passed by unnoticed. His poems thus derive strength from the quotidian, but only by recreating and reconceptualizing it. Irony is another of Oh's techniques adopted to criticize a false and fetishistic ideal world. By thus lifting aspects of the mundane and banal up to his scrutinizing eye, out of the fabric of our “modern unconsciousness,” he captures the contradictory and complex features of the modern petit bourgeois and helps us to rediscover our own lives. Oh's poems also demonstrate the influence of the fable and his fascination with the most common of words, which often serve him as elements of parody and ironic critique.

Oh Kyu Won's work has attempted to demolish old conceptual frames and stale assumptions and to look at the world in its naked reality. In order to do this, Oh frequently uses the technique of reversal:

The coffin of the man asphyxiated by coal briquet gas
Passes through the gate of the apartment dragging two men along
A lilac tree steps out of the crowd of onlookers and leaves reality in the company of the coffin.

Through such reversals of death and life, mobile and immobile, Oh tries to provide a fresh point of view, one that might even be characterized as Brechtian.

Oh has received such prizes as the Contemporary Literature Prize and the Yeonam Literature Prize as well as the Korea culture and arts prize for literature and I-San Literary Award.

Works in Korean (partial)
Collections and Anthologies
 A Definite Event (1971)
 A Pilgrimage (1973)
 The Technique of Love (1975)
 To a Boy Who is not a Prince (1978)
 A Lyrical Poem Written in this Land (1981)
 Living Making Hope (1985)
 Life Under Heaven (1989)
Poetics & Composition
 Reality and Stoicism (1982)
 Language and Life (1983)
 Methods of Modern Poetic Composition. (1990)

Awards
 Contemporary Literature Prize 
 Yeonam Literature Prize 
 Korea culture and Arts Prize for Literature
 I-San Literary Award

References 

1941 births
South Korean male poets
Academic staff of Seoul Institute of the Arts
People from South Gyeongsang Province
2007 deaths
20th-century South Korean poets
20th-century male writers
Dong-a University alumni